Code page 896 (CCSIDs 896 and 4992), called Japan 7-Bit Katakana Extended, is IBM's code page for code-set G2 of EUC-JP, a 7-bit code page representing the Kana set (upper half) of JIS X 0201 and accompanying Code page 895 which corresponds to the lower half of that standard. It encodes half-width katakana.

Code page 896 is a 7-bit encoding and therefore does not use the high bit. When it used as the right half of an 8-bit encoding, all values except 0x20 use encoding bytes 0x80 above those defined in the code page (i.e. with the high bit set).

In addition to the standard JIS X 0201 assignments in CCSID 896, CCSID 4992 defines five extended characters at code points 60-64.

Codepage layout

References 

896